The following tree species and cultivars in the genus Prunus (family Rosaceae) currently (2016)
hold the Royal Horticultural Society's Award of Garden Merit. All are described as flowering or ornamental cherries, though they have mixed parentage, and some have several or unknown parents. They are valued for their spring blossom, and in some cases ornamental fruit and bark. This list does not include the edible, or culinary, fruit trees in the genus Prunus (cherries, peaches, almonds, plums etc.). Dimensions shown are the maximum, which can often be restricted by regular pruning. Many cultivars also lend themselves to bonsai treatment.

A note on species names; where only Prunus is indicated, the species or hybrid name is unknown or conjectural.

See also
Cherry
Cherry blossom
Hanami (Japanese cherry blossom festival)
Prunus

References

Lists of Award of Garden Merit plants